Sherali Bozorov (born 23 October 1981 in Kulob, Khatlon) is a Tajikistani judoka, who played for the half-middleweight category. He won a silver medal for his division at the 2007 Asian Judo Championships in Kuwait City, Kuwait, losing out to South Korea's Kwong Young-Woo.

Bozorov represented Tajikistan at the 2008 Summer Olympics in Beijing, where he competed for the men's half-middleweight class (81 kg). Unfortunately, he lost the first preliminary round match, by a yuko and a non-combativity technique (P29), to Togo's Kouami Sacha Denanyoh.

References

External links

NBC 2008 Olympics profile

Tajikistani male judoka
Living people
Olympic judoka of Tajikistan
Judoka at the 2008 Summer Olympics
1981 births
People from Khatlon Region
Judoka at the 1998 Asian Games
Judoka at the 2002 Asian Games
Judoka at the 2010 Asian Games
Asian Games competitors for Tajikistan
21st-century Tajikistani people
20th-century Tajikistani people